ATN SAB TV is a Canadian Category B Hindi language specialty channel owned by Asian Television Network (ATN). It broadcasts programming from SAB TV as well as Canadian content.

ATN SAB TV is a family entertainment channel with a focus on comedy-themed programming.  It airs various comedy programs including light hearted family shows, silent comedies and dramedies.

History
ATN SAB TV was licensed by the CRTC on February 28, 2011 as ATN Comedy Channel One.  It officially launched on February 17, 2011 as ATN SAB TV.

References

External links
 
 SAB TV

Digital cable television networks in Canada
Television channels and stations established in 2010
Hindi-language television in Canada